The 1958 Kansas Jayhawks football team represented the University of Kansas in the Big Seven Conference during the 1958 NCAA University Division football season. In their first season under head coach Jack Mitchell, the Jayhawks compiled a 4–5–1 record (3–2–1 against conference opponents), finished fourth in the Big Seven Conference, and were outscored by all opponents by a combined total of 175 to 87. They played their home games at Memorial Stadium in Lawrence, Kansas.

The team's statistical leaders included Homer Floyd with 391 rushing yards and 307 receiving yards and Larry McKown with 219 passing yards. Homer Floyd and Bob Marshall were the team captains.

Schedule

References

Kansas
Kansas Jayhawks football seasons
Kansas Jayhawks football